Lithoglyptida is an order of barnacles in the class Thecostraca. There are 2 families and more than 40 described species in Lithoglyptida.

Taxonomy
These families, subfamilies, and genera belong to the order Lithoglyptida:
 Family Lithoglyptidae Aurivillius, 1892
 Subfamily Berndtiinae Utinomi, 1950
 Genus Berndtia Utinomi, 1950
 Genus Weltneria Berndt, 1907
 Subfamily Kochlorininae Gruvel, 1905
 Genus Kochlorine Noll, 1872
 Genus Kochlorinopsis Stubbings, 1967
 Subfamily Lithoglyptinae Aurivillius, 1892
 Genus Auritoglyptes Kolbasov & Newman, 2005
 Genus Balanodytes Utinomi, 1950
 Genus Lithoglyptes Aurivillius, 1892
 Family Trypetesidae Stebbing, 1910
 Genus Tomlinsonia Turquier, 1985
 Genus Trypetesa Norman, 1903

References

Barnacles